Aleksander Paikre (also Aleksander Porman(n); 30 December 1871, in Lehtse Parish (now Tapa Parish), Jerwen County – 2 August 1955, in Tapa) was an Estonian politician. He was a member of II Riigikogu.

References

1871 births
1955 deaths
People from Tapa Parish
People from Kreis Jerwen
Tenants' Union politicians
Settlers' Party politicians
Members of the Riigikogu, 1923–1926